Barlinek  is a town in Myślibórz County, in West Pomeranian Voivodeship, in northwestern Poland. It is the administrative seat of Gmina Barlinek. As of December 2021, the town has a population of 13,491.

Geography

History

A gord settlement existed in present-day Barlinek in the Middle Ages. The area formed part of Poland after the creation of the Polish state in the 10th century. It was part of the province of Greater Poland, before being annexed by the Margraviate of Brandenburg in the late 13th century. The settlement of Nova Berlyn was first mentioned in a 1278 deed, when it was founded by the Ascanian margraves of Brandenburg. It was meant as a stronghold in the newly acquired Neumark region, bordering on the Pomeranian estates around nearby Pełczyce, which the margraves nevertheless conquered soon afterwards.

In the 14th century, the town gained its first fortified walls (still partly visible). In 1373 the town became part of the Lands of the Bohemian (Czech) Crown, ruled by the Luxembourg dynasty. In 1402, the Luxembourgs reached an agreement with Poland in Kraków. Poland was to buy and re-incorporate the region, but eventually the Luxembourgs sold it to the Teutonic Order. In 1454 the Teutonic Knights sold the town to the Margraviate of Brandenburg in order to raise funds for war with Poland. From 1701 it belonged to the Kingdom of Prussia and between 1871 and 1945 it was part of Germany. As a part of Germany, Barlinek was called Berlinchen. From the 18th century onwards the town prospered as a centre of brewing and cloth manufacturing.

After the defeat of Nazi Germany in World War II, the town was transferred to the Republic of Poland and renamed Barlinek. The remaining German population was expelled and the town was repopulated by Poles, many of whom were also expelled from former Eastern Poland annexed by the Soviet Union.

Between 1975 and 1998, the town belonged to Gorzów Wielkopolski Voivodeship.

Notable people
 Karl Wilhelm Posselt (1815–1885), German missionary active in South Africa 
 Berthold Lasker (1860-1928), German physician, writer and chess master. 
 Emanuel Lasker (1868-1941), German chess player, mathematician and philosopher; World Chess Champion from 1894 to 1921
 Józef Pilarz (1956–2008), Polish politician, elected to the Sejm in 2005
 Dariusz Jarecki (born 1981), Polish footballer, over 260 pro games 
 Marcin Matkowski (born 1981), Polish professional tennis player whose speciality is in doubles
 Adam Hrycaniuk (born 1984), Polish basketball player

International relations

Twin towns - sister cities

Barlinek is twinned with:
 Gryfino, Poland
 Courrières, France
 Prenzlau, Germany
 Schneverdingen, Germany

Gallery

References

External links

 Official website 
 Jewish Community of Barlinek on Virtual Shtetl

Cities and towns in West Pomeranian Voivodeship
Myślibórz County
History of Brandenburg
Former states and territories of Brandenburg